Iva Borović (born October 5, 1988 in Zadar, SFR Yugoslavia) is a Croatian female basketball player.

External links
Profile at eurobasket.com

Living people
1988 births
Basketball players from Zadar
Croatian women's basketball players
Point guards
Croatian Women's Basketball League players